Jarmo is a Finnish and Estonian masculine given name. Notable people with the name include:

Jarmo Ahjupera (born 1984), Estonian football player
Jarmo Alatensiö (1963–2003), football player
Jarmo Hakala (born 1954), Olympic canoer
Jarmo Hyttinen, actor
Jarmo Jokila (born 1986), ice hockey player
Jarmo Kekäläinen (born 1966), ice hockey player
Jarmo Koski (born 1951), actor
Jarmo Kytölehto (born 1961), rally driver
Jarmo Kärnä (born 1958), long jumper
Jarmo Lampela (born 1964), film director
Jarmo Lehtinen (born 1969), rally co-driver
Jarmo Lehtinen, sports commentator
Jarmo Manninen (born 1951), football player
Jarmo Matikainen (born 1960), football manager
Jarmo Myllys (born 1965), ice hockey goaltender
Jarmo Mäkinen (born 1958), actor
Jarmo Puolakanaho, guitar player
Jarmo Saastamoinen (born 1967), football player
Jarmo Sandelin (born 1967), Swedish-Finn professional golfer
Jarmo Savolainen (1961–2009), jazz pianist
Jarmo Valtonen (born 1982), speed skater
Jarmo Wasama (1943–1966), ice hockey player
Jarmo Övermark (born 1955), Olympic wrestler

Finnish masculine given names
Estonian masculine given names